Meadowbrook High School may refer to:

Meadowbrook High School (Byesville, Ohio)
Meadowbrook High School (North Chesterfield, Virginia)
Meadowbrook High School, Jamaica